Microgynoecium is a genus of flowering plants belonging to the family Amaranthaceae.

Its native range is Central Asia to Northern China and Himalaya.

Species
Species:
 Microgynoecium tibeticum Hook.f.

References

Chenopodioideae
Amaranthaceae genera